Eatoniella subgoniostoma is a species of minute sea snail, a marine gastropod mollusk in the family Eatoniellidae, the eatoniellids

Description

Distribution

References

Eatoniellidae
Gastropods described in 1908